Atrypsiastis is a genus of moths belonging to the subfamily Olethreutinae of the family Tortricidae.

Species
Atrypsiastis salva Meyrick, in Caradja, 1932

See also
List of Tortricidae genera

References

External links
tortricidae.com

Tortricidae genera
Monotypic moth genera
Olethreutinae
Taxa named by Edward Meyrick